Marcus Ross Freiberger ( – June 29, 2005) was an American basketball player from Amarillo, Texas who was a Gold Medalist in the 1952 Summer Olympics.

Playing career
At 6'11", Freiberger played collegiately for the Oklahoma Sooners.

He was a member of the 1952 United States men's Olympic basketball team that won the Gold Medal in Helsinki.

From 1951–1955 Freiberger played for the Caterpillar Diesels and then the Houston Ada Oilers in the National Industrial Basketball League.

Death
Freiberger died in Winston-Salem, North Carolina on June 29, 2005.

References

External links
profile

1928 births
2005 deaths
American men's basketball players
Basketball players at the 1952 Summer Olympics
Basketball players from Texas
Indianapolis Olympians draft picks
Medalists at the 1952 Summer Olympics
Oklahoma Sooners men's basketball players
Olympic gold medalists for the United States in basketball
Peoria Caterpillars players
Sportspeople from Amarillo, Texas
United States men's national basketball team players
Centers (basketball)